The 2017 CMT Music Awards were held at Music City Center in Nashville, Tennessee on June 7, 2017. Charles Esten was the host for the show. The CMT Music Awards are a fan-voted awards show for country music videos and television performances; Voting takes place on CMT's website.

Winners and nominees 
Winners are shown in bold.

References 

CMT Music Awards
2017 music awards